Christopher E. Smith (born 1958) is an American  legal academic who is a specialist in correctional law. He succeeded lawyer and political activist Zolton Ferency as Michigan State University's faculty specialist on constitutional rights in criminal justice. He teaches courses on criminal justice, law, and public policy in Michigan State's School of Criminal Justice.

Biography 
After growing up in Michigan, Smith earned his bachelor's degree from Harvard University before earning a master's degree at the University of Bristol, a J.D. degree at the University of Tennessee, and a Ph.D. in political science from the University of Connecticut.  He joined Michigan State University's faculty in 1994 after previously teaching political science at the University of Akron and the University of Connecticut-Hartford.

Work 
Smith has written dozens of books focusing on American government, constitutional law, criminal justice, and the U.S. Supreme Court. As the author of more than 100 articles for both scholarly and public audiences, his work has appeared in The Atlantic, American Journal of Criminal Justice, and Political Research Quarterly.

Legislative career
In 2018, Smith was a candidate for the US House from the MI-08 district. He was defeated in the Democratic primary by Elissa Slotkin, who also won the general election.

References

1958 births
Living people
American legal scholars
Michigan State University faculty
Harvard University alumni
Alumni of the University of Bristol
University of Tennessee College of Law alumni
University of Connecticut alumni